Officium Defunctorum is a musical setting of the Office of the Dead composed by the Spanish Renaissance composer Tomás Luis de Victoria in 1603. The texts have also been set by other composers including Morales. 

Victoria includes settings of the movements of the Requiem Mass, accounting for about 26 minutes of the 42 minute composition, and the work is sometimes referred to as Victoria's Requiem. However, it is not his only requiem, in 1583, Victoria composed and published a book of Masses, reprinted in 1592, including a Missa pro defunctis for four-part choir.

Victoria's Officium Defunctorum is considered one of the greatest works of sacred choral music of the Renaissance.

History
From the 1580s Victoria worked at a convent in Madrid where he served as chaplain to the Dowager Empress Maria, sister of Philip II of Spain, daughter of Charles V, wife of Maximilian II and mother of two emperors. 
Officium Defunctorum was composed for the funeral of the Empress Maria.
She died on February 26, 1603, and the great obsequies were performed on April 22 and 23. After Victoria made revisions and published Officium Defunctorum in 1605, he added a dedication to Margret, Maria's daughter. This piece was also Victoria's last composition before he passed In 1611.

Publication

Victoria published eleven volumes of his music during his lifetime, representing the majority of his compositional output. Officium Defunctorum, the only work to be published by itself, was the eleventh volume and the last work Victoria published. It was dedicated to Princess Margaret, who was a nun in the same convent as her mother, for “the obsequies of your most revered mother”. The date of publication, 1605, is often included with the title to differentiate the Officium Defunctorum from Victoria's other setting of the Requiem Mass. With the revisions, Victoria included the entirety of the Office of the Dead, including both the requiem mass and ceremonial music for both before and after the actual funeral service, due to the liturgical rulings at the time.

Structure

Officium Defunctorum is scored for six-part SSATTB chorus. It was possibly intended to be sung with two singers to each part.

It includes an entire Office of the Dead: in addition to a Requiem Mass, Victoria sets an extra-liturgical funeral motet, a lesson that belongs to Matins (scored for only SATB and not always included in concert performances), and the ceremony of Absolution which follows the Mass. Polyphonic sections are separated by unaccompanied chant incipits Victoria printed himself. The Soprano II usually carries the cantus firmus, though "it very often disappears into the surrounding part-writing since the chant does not move as slowly as most cantus firmus parts and the polyphony does not generally move very fast." The sections of the work are as follows:

 Second Lesson of Matins
Taedet animam meam (motet; Job 10:1–7)
Missa Pro Defunctis (Mass for the Dead)
With the Council of Trent, the liturgy of the Requiem Mass was standardized. Victoria sets all of the Requiem Mass sections except the Dies Irae sequence.
Introit
Kyrie
Gradual
Offertory
Sanctus
Agnus Dei
Communion
Versa est in luctum cithara mea (motet; Job 30:31)
The Absolution 
Libera me (responsory)
Kyrie

References
Atlas, Allan W. Renaissance Music. New York; London: W. W. Norton & Company, 1998. 
Phillips, Peter. Liner notes to Victoria Requiem. The Tallis Scholars and Peter Philips, cond. Published 2001. Gimell B00005ATD0
Turner, Bruno. editorial preface to Officium Defunctorum, by Tomás Luis de Victoria. London: Vanderbeek & Imrie, 1988. Mapa Mundi, Series A: Spanish Church Music; no. 75.
Gatens, William J. 2021. “Officium Defunctorum.” American Record Guide 84 (3): 110.
Barker, John W. “VICTORIA: Officium Defunctorum; Motet (Music).” American Record Guide 66, no. 5 (September 2003): 200.

Notes

External links
tomasluisdevictoria.org

Choral compositions
Requiems
Compositions by Tomás Luis de Victoria
1603 works